Luo Baoming (born October 1952) is a Chinese politician who spent his career in Tianjin and Hainan province.  Since 2011, Luo has served as the Communist Party Secretary of Hainan province; prior to that he served as governor of Hainan between 2007 and 2011.

Early life and education
Luo was born in October 1952 in Tianjin.  During the Cultural Revolution, Luo went to work for a military production corps in Inner Mongolia.  He joined the Chinese Communist Party in 1971.  He pursued higher education at Tianjin Normal College after the Cultural Revolution, after which he entered the Communist Youth League organization in his native Tianjin, working as a youth organizer. Then he worked briefly in 1984 as head of the municipal research office.

Career 
In 1985, Luo was named head of the Communist Youth League organization of Tianjin. Between 1991 and 1994, he earned a part-time master's degree in Ming and Qing Dynasty history from Nankai University.  In 1997, Luo was named to the Tianjin municipal Party Standing Committee, then head of the municipal party committee's propaganda department.  In 2001, Luo was named deputy party chief of the island province of Hainan; he then served several months concurrently as the province's propaganda chief, before relinquishing that role and continuing serving as the 'full-time' deputy party chief. He would stay in this position until 2007. Luo was first elected governor of Hainan by the Hainan People's Congress in February 2007. He was re-elected governor by the People's Congress on January 29, 2008. In August 2011 Luo was promoted to Communist Party Chief of Hainan and was succeeded by Jiang Dingzhi as governor.

In 2017, Luo left his post as party chief of Hainan, and was made a vice chair of the National People's Congress Overseas Chinese Affairs Committee.

Luo was an alternate member of 15th and 16th Central Committees of Chinese Communist Party, and is a full member of 17th and 18th Central Committees of CCP.

References

                                                                                                                                                 

Living people
1952 births
Governors of Hainan
People's Republic of China politicians from Tianjin
Chinese Communist Party politicians from Tianjin
Nankai University alumni